Balaxanı-Sabunçu Polis İdarəsi Süvari Qorodovoylarının At Oynatmaları(Balakhani-Sabunchu police station cavalry gorodovoy horse racing) is one of the earliest films ever produced in the cinema of Azerbaijan directed by Azeri cinema pioneer Aleksandr Mişon. It was released in 1898.

The film was shot on 35mm.

See also
List of Azerbaijani films: 1898-1919

References

External links

1898 films
Azerbaijani silent short films
Azerbaijani black-and-white films
Films of the Russian Empire
1898 short films
1890s short documentary films